is a male Japanese table tennis player. He paired with Jun Mizutani in men's doubles competitions, the duo won four consecutive national titles from 2007 to 2010. They also won a bronze medal at the 2009 World Championships and two titles at the ITTF Pro Tour. He currently plays for the German team TTC Ruhrstadt Herne.

References

External links
 

1987 births
Living people
Japanese male table tennis players
Olympic table tennis players of Japan
Table tennis players at the 2008 Summer Olympics
Table tennis players at the 2012 Summer Olympics
Asian Games medalists in table tennis
Table tennis players at the 2006 Asian Games
Table tennis players at the 2010 Asian Games
Table tennis players at the 2014 Asian Games
Medalists at the 2010 Asian Games
Medalists at the 2014 Asian Games
Asian Games bronze medalists for Japan
World Table Tennis Championships medalists